Thomas B. Woodward (died November 29, 1871) was an American politician and jurist. He was the 6th Secretary of State of Mississippi, serving from 1839 to 1841.

Biography 
Woodward was born in South Carolina, but later moved to Yazoo County, Mississippi. He became a member of the Democratic Party. He represented Yazoo County in the Mississippi House of Representatives in 1838. He was appointed to the office of Secretary of State of Mississippi in 1839, replacing Barry W. Benson, who had died in office. Woodward's term ended in November 1841. Woodward was succeeded in office by L. G. Galloway. Woodward later moved to Sulphur Springs, Texas. He died near there, in Hopkins County, Texas, on November 29, 1871.

References 

1871 deaths
Secretaries of State of Mississippi
Democratic Party members of the Mississippi House of Representatives
19th-century American politicians
19th-century American judges
People from Yazoo County, Mississippi
Year of birth missing
People from Sulphur Springs, Texas